Shayilan Nuerdanbieke (born May 4, 1994 ) is a Chinese mixed martial artist who competes in the Featherweight division of the Ultimate Fighting Championship.

Background
Nurdanbek comes from the Ili Kazakh Autonomous Prefecture, which is located in northern Xinjiang, straddling the borders of Kazakhstan, Russia and Mongolia. He belongs to the Kazakh minority, training wrestling for 6 years and winning the 66KG Classical Wrestling Championship in Xinjiang and participated in many national competitions. After seeing Conor McGregor on television, he was inspired to try his hand in MMA.

He spends his free time practicing the dombra, a traditional stringed Kazakh musical instrument.

Mixed martial arts career

Early career
Starting his professional career in 2016, Nuerdanbieke compiled a 37–9 record fighting on the Chinese regional scene.

Ultimate Fighting Championship
Nurdanbek made his UFC debut against Joshua Culibao at UFC Fight Night: Font vs. Garbrandt on May 22, 2021. He lost the fight by unanimous decision.

Nurdanbek bounced back against Sean Soriano on November 20, 2021 at UFC Fight Night 198. He won the bout via unanimous decision.

Nurdanbek faced T.J. Brown on June 25, 2022 at UFC on ESPN 38. He won the fight via unanimous decision.

Nurdanbek faced Darrick Minner on November 5, 2022 at UFC Fight Night 214. He won the fight via technical knockout in the first round. The fight was later part of a controversy when Minner and his coach James Krause were suspended by UFC when suspicious betting patterns emerged.

Nurdanbek is scheduled to face Steve Garcia April 8, 2023, at UFC 287.

Mixed martial arts record

|-
|Win
|align=center|39–10
|Darrick Minner
|TKO (elbows)
|UFC Fight Night: Rodriguez vs. Lemos
|
|align=center|1
|align=center|1:07
|Las Vegas, Nevada, United States
|
|-
|Win
|align=center|38–10
|T.J. Brown
|Decision (unanimous)
|UFC on ESPN: Tsarukyan vs. Gamrot
|
|align=center|3
|align=center|5:00
|Las Vegas, Nevada, United States
|
|-
|Win
|align=center|37–10
|Sean Soriano
|Decision (unanimous)
|UFC Fight Night: Vieira vs. Tate
|
|align=center|3
|align=center|5:00
|Las Vegas, Nevada, United States
|
|-
|Loss
|align=center|36–10
|Joshua Culibao
|Decision (unanimous)
|UFC Fight Night: Font vs. Garbrandt
|
|align=center|3
|align=center|5:00
|Las Vegas, Nevada, United States
|
|-
|Win
|align=center|36–9
|Tanzhao Wang
|Submission (rear-naked choke)
|JCK Bounty Challenge Series: 2020 Trials Championship
|
|align=center|1
|align=center|2:59
|Langfang, China
|
|-
|Win
|align=center|35–9
|Nuerdebieke Bahetihan
|Decision (unanimous)
|JCK Bounty Challenge Series: 2020 Trials Elimination Round 1
|
|align=center|3
|align=center|5:00
|Langfang, China
|
|-
|Loss
|align=center|34–9
|Rong Zhu
|KO (punches)
|WLF W.A.R.S. 47
|
|align=center|1
|align=center|2:05
|Zhengzhou, China
|
|-
|Win
|align=center|34–8
|Huwanixi Wusikenbieke
|Submission (arm-triangle choke)
|WLF W.A.R.S. 46
|
|align=center|1
|align=center|4:03
|Zhengzhou, China
|
|-
|Win
|align=center|33–8
|Yibugele
|TKO (punches)
|WLF W.A.R.S. 43
|
|align=center|3
|align=center|4:40 
|Zhengzhou, China
|
|-
|Win
|align=center|32–8
|Alexey Oleinik
|TKO (retirement)
|WLF W.A.R.S. 41
|
|align=center|1
|align=center|5:00
|Zhengzhou, China
|
|-
|Win
|align=center|31–8
|Kikadze Bondo
|Submission (rear-naked choke)
|WLF W.A.R.S. 39
|
|align=center|1
|align=center|2:51
|Zhengzhou, China
|
|-
|Win
|align=center|30–8
|Wilson Djavan
|Decision (unanimous)
|ICKF: World Combat Championship
|
|align=center|3
|align=center|5:00
|São Lázaro, Macau
|
|-
|Loss
|align=center|29–8
|Alisson Barbosa
|Submission (triangle choke)
|WLF W.A.R.S. 33
|
|align=center|2 
|align=center|3:39
|Zhengzhou, China
|
|-
|Loss
|align=center|29–7
|Bakhtier Ibragimov
|KO (body kick)
|Kunlun Fight: Elite Fight Night 2 
|
|align=center|1
|align=center|2:49
|Tongling, China
|
|-
|Win
|align=center|29–6
|Yibugele
|KO (punches)
|Chin Woo Men: 2017-2018 Season: Stage 9
|
|align=center|1
|align=center|0:23
|Guangzhou, China
|
|-
|Win
|align=center|28–6
|Syovuzh
|KO (punches)
|Chin Woo Men: 2017-2018 Season: Stage 8
|
|align=center|1
|align=center|1:10
|Guangzhou, China
|
|-
|Loss
|align=center|27–6
|Ruslan Emilbek
|Submission (rear-naked choke)
|Chin Woo Men: 2017-2018 Season: Stage 6
|
|align=center|3
|align=center|4:45
|Guangzhou, China
|
|-
|Win
|align=center|27–5
|Shalawujiang Yeerruer
|TKO (body kick and punches)
|Chin Woo Men: 2017-2018 Season: Stage 4
|
|align=center|1
|align=center|3:37
|Hefei, China
|
|-
|Win
|align=center|26–5
|Shaka Shanzis
|Submission (straight armbar)
|Chinese Kung Fu Championships
|
|align=center|1
|align=center|2:15
|Kunming, China
|
|-
|Win
|align=center|25–5
|Shunya Imai
|TKO (punches)
|Road FC 44
|
|align=center|1
|align=center|3:38
|Shijiazhuang, China
|
|-
|Win
|align=center|24–5
|Zack Shaw
|TKO (punches)
|Kunlun Fight MMA 15
|
|align=center|1
|align=center|1:27
|Alashan, China
|
|-
|Loss
|align=center|23–5
|Yibugele
|Decision (unanimous)
|Chin Woo Men: 2016-2017 Season: Individuals' Finals
|
|align=center|4
|align=center|5:00
|Guangzhou, China
|
|-
|Win
|align=center|23–4
|Leandro Rodrigues
|TKO (submission to punches)
|Kunlun Fight MMA 14
|
|align=center|1
|align=center|3:04
|Qingdao, China
|
|-
|Win
|align=center|22–4
|Stefan Pijuk
|Decision (unanimous)
|CKF Macau
|
|align=center|3
|align=center|5:00
|Macau
|
|-
|Win
|align=center|21–4
|David Muñoz
|KO (punches)
|Kunlun Fight MMA 13
|
|align=center|1
|align=center|0:42
|Qingdao, China
|
|-
|Win
|align=center|20–4
|Arthit Hanchana
|Decision (unanimous)
|Chinese MMA Super League: Day 5
|
|align=center|3 
|align=center|5:00
|Sanya, China
|
|-
|Win
|align=center|19–4
|Junkai Yang
|TKO (punches)
|Chin Woo Men: 2016-2017 Season: Individuals' Tournament Quarterfinals
|
|align=center|1
|align=center|1:17
|Guangzhou, China
|
|-
|Win
|align=center|18–4
|Changzhao Yu
|TKO (punches)
|Chinese MMA Super League: Finals
|
|align=center|2
|align=center|4:52
|Shanghai, China
|
|-
|Win
|align=center|17–4
|Yikun Zhao
|Decision (unanimous)
|Chinese MMA Super League: Semifinals
|
|align=center|3
|align=center|5:00
|Shanghai, China
|
|-
|Win
|align=center|16–4
|Swapnil
|TKO (punches)
|CKF Pacific International Fighting Dali: Day 1
|
|align=center|1
|align=center|0:41
|Dali City, China
|
|-
|Win
|align=center|15–4
|Huiyong Yang
|TKO (punches)
|CKF Fighting League Finals 5: Day 2
|
|align=center|1
|align=center|4:07
|Beijing, China
|
|-
|Win
|align=center|14–4
|Xiaofan Wei
|TKO (punches)
|CKF Fighting League Finals 5: Day 1
|
|align=center|1
|align=center|2:04
|Beijing, China
|
|-
|Loss
|align=center|13–4
|Brian Tadeo
|Submission (reverse triangle armbar)
|WLF W.A.R.S. 12
|
|align=center|1
|align=center|2:56
|Zhengzhou, China
|
|-
|Loss
|align=center|13–3
|Missael Silva de Souza
|Submission (rear-naked choke)
|Chin Woo Men: 2016-2017 Season: Desperate Part 1
|
|align=center|1
|align=center|2:37
|Guangzhou, China
|
|-
|Win
|align=center|13–2
|Renjie Cao
|Submission (armbar)
|Chin Woo Men: 2016-2017 Season: Fierce Battle Part 1
|
|align=center|1
|align=center|2:09
|Guangzhou, China
|
|-
|Win
|align=center|12–2
|Rodrigo Anraku
|KO (slam and punches)
|Chinese MMA Super League: Day 4
|
|align=center|1
|align=center|1:02
|Zhongshan, China
|
|-
|Win
|align=center|11–2
|Zhenyue Huang
|Decision (majority)
|Chinese MMA Super League: Day 5
|
|align=center|3
|align=center|5:00
|Tianjin, China
|
|-
|Win
|align=center|10–2
|Tinggui Lang
|Decision (unanimous)
|Chinese MMA Super League: Day 4
|
|align=center|3
|align=center|5:00
|Tianjin, China
|
|-
|Win
|align=center|9–2
|Jiale Li
|TKO (corner stoppage)
|Chinese MMA Super League: Day 3
|
|align=center|1
|align=center|3:57
|Tianjin, China
|
|-
|Win
|align=center|8–2
|Lei Huang
|TKO (punches)
|Chinese MMA Super League: Day 1
|
|align=center|1
|align=center|1:17
|Tianjin, China
|
|-
|Win
|align=center| 7–2
|Temirlan Aysadilov
|Decision (split)
|Kingway & Beijing Combat
|
|align=center|3
|align=center|5:00
|Changping, China
|
|-
|Win
|align=center|6–2
|Nuerjiang
|Submission (guillotine choke)
|Superstar Fight 5
|
|align=center|1
|align=center|2:04
|Beijing, China
|
|-
|Win
|align=center|5–2
|Anatoliy
|Submission (arm-triangle choke)
|WKG International MMA Tournament 3
|
|align=center|3
|align=center|2:03
|Harbin, China
|
|-
|Loss
|align=center|4–2
|Tao Zhou
|Submission (rear-naked choke)
|Art of War: Hero List 2
|
|align=center|1
|align=center|6:08
|Beijing, China
|
|-
|Win
|align=center|4–1
|Guicheng Liu
|TKO (punches)
|Art of War: Hero List
|
|align=center|1
|align=center|2:50
|Beijing, China
|
|-
|Loss
|align=center|3–1
|Nuerdebieke Bahetihan
|Submission (shoulder choke)
|Chinese MMA Super League: Day 4
|
|align=center|2
|align=center|3:24
|Jinzhou, China
|
|-
|Win
|align=center|3–0
|Mingyang Li
|Submission (rear-naked choke)
|Chinese MMA Super League: Day 3
|
|align=center|1
|align=center|3:56
|Jinzhou, China
|
|-
|Win
|align=center|2–0
|Yusheng Wang
|Submission (arm-triangle choke)
|Chinese MMA Super League: Day 2
|
|align=center|1
|align=center|2:43
|Jinzhou, China
|
|-
|Win
|align=center|1–0
|Avzalbek Kuranbaev
|Submission (rear-naked choke)
|Bullet Fly FC 6
|
|align=center|1
|align=center|2:28
|Beijing, China
|

See also 
 List of current UFC fighters
 List of male mixed martial artists

References

External links 
  
 

1994 births
Living people
Chinese male mixed martial artists
Featherweight mixed martial artists
Mixed martial artists utilizing Greco-Roman wrestling
Ultimate Fighting Championship male fighters
Chinese male sport wrestlers
Chinese people of Kazakhstani descent
Dombra players